This is a list of monarchies of Ethiopia that existed throughout the nation's history. It is divided into kingdoms that were subdivisions of Ethiopia, and kingdoms that were later conquered by Ethiopia. Ancient kingdoms fall into neither category.

Ancient Ethiopia
Dʿmt Kingdom (8th century BC – 7th/5th century BC)
Kingdom of Aksum – used title Nəguśä nägäśt ("King of Kings") like later Emperors, but traditionally called a Kingdom (Early period 5th/4th century BC – 1st century BC; Main period 1st century BC/AD – 7th century; Late Aksumite period 7th century – 9th/10th/11th/12th? century)

Medieval Ethiopia (to 1527)
Transition from Aksumite period to Zagwe dynasty somewhere between 9th–12th centuries.
Transition from Zagwe dynasty to Solomonic dynasty in 1270.

Vassal Kingdoms
Adal (see Walashma dynasty)
Bali (later Bale)
Damot
Dawaro
Fatagar
Gojjam
Hadiya
Ifat
Innarya
Mora
Wag

Annexed Kingdoms
 Sultanate of Shewa

Post-1527 Kingdoms

Independent
 Adal Sultanate (until demise in 1577)
 Emirate of Harar - (independent of Aussa Imamate from 1647; ruled by the Ali dynasty, see Emirs of Harar)

Kingdoms annexed by the Ethiopian empire in the 19th century
 Emirate of Harar
 Kingdom of Garo or Bosha - foundation 1567
 title: Tatu
 dynasty: Tegra`i Bushasho dynasty
See: Rulers of Bosha

 Kingdom of Gera
 title: Moti
See: Rulers of the Gibe State of Gera

 Kingdom of Gomma - foundation 1800
 title Moti
 dynasty: 'Awulyani dynasty
See: Rulers of the Gibe State of Goma

 Kingdom of Gumma
 title Moti
See: Rulers of the Gibe State of Guma

 Kingdom of Janjero - founded before 1600
See: Rulers of the Janjero state of Gimirra

 Kingdom of Jimma
 title Moti
See: Rulers of the Gibe state of Jimma

 Kingdom of Kaffa - foundation 1390 old Kaffa Kingdom; 1700 for new Kaffa Empire
 title: Emperor (or Kafi Atio, last two also Atiojo)
 dynasty: Bushasho dynasty, one of the Minjo families
 rulers:
 c.1390 Minjo
 1425 - 1460 Shongetato (also known as the Girra king)
 1460 - 1495 Odhe/Addiotato
 1495 - 1530 Sadi or Shaddi/Shaditato
 1530 - 1565 Madi Gafine/Gafo or Shonge, possibly the same as Borrete
 1565 - 1605 Bong-he or Borrete or Bongatato, said to be the son of Madi Gafo
 1605 - 1640 Giba Nekiok or Bonge or Galo Nechocho
 1640 - 1675 Gali Gafocho or Gali Ginok
 1675 - 1710 Gali Ginocho or Tan Ginok
 1710 - 1742 Gaki Gaocho or Otti Sheroch, Taki Gaok
 1742 - 1775 Gali Gaocho or Kanechoch, Galli
 1775 - 1795 Shagi Sherocho or Gali Keffoch, Sagi Saro
 1795 - 1798 Beshi Ginocho or Kaye Sheroch, Beshi Gino
 1798 - 1821 Hoti Gaocho or Beshi Sheroch, Oto
 1821 - 1845 Gaha Nechocho or Gali Sheroch, Ganecho
 1845 - 1854 Gawi Nechocho or Haji Ginoch, Gaul Saro
 1854 - November 1870 Kaye Sherocho or Kamo
 November 1870 - April 1890 Gali Sherocho
 6 April 1890 - 10 September 1897 Gaki Sherocho
Source: C.F. Beckingham and G.W.B. Huntingford, Some Records of Ethiopia, 1593-1646 (London: Hakluyt Society, 1954), p. lvi. Amnon Orent, "Refocusing on the History of Kafa prior to 1897: A Discussion of Political Processes" in African Historical Studies, Vol. 3, No. 2. (1970), p. 268.

 Leqa Naqamte - foundation before 1871, ruled Welega from Nekemte
 title: Moti
 rulers:
 (until mid-1870s) Bakare
 (mid-1870s)-1889 Moroda
 1889-1932 Kumsa Moroda (later known as Gebre Iziabiher)
 Limmu-Ennarea
 ruling title: Supera
See: Rulers of the Gibe State of Limu-'Enarya; Innarya

 Welayta - foundation 1250 (not under Tigray dynasty until 1600)
 ruling title: Kawa
 ruling dynasty: Tigray dynasty
See: Rulers of Welayta

Other
Kingdom of Zion (consisting of Tigray, Gondar, Gojjam, and Semien) under King (Negus) Mikael of Wollo 1914 - 1916

Unidentified kingdoms or chiefdoms
The following polities are unidentified kingdoms or chiefdoms, and are not mentioned in standard references:

 Leqa Qellam: foundation before 1870
 title Moti
 rulers:
 x-188? Jote Talu
 Sheka - foundation 1560
 title: Tato
 rulers
 1670-1740 Bedi Goechi
 1740-1780 Giba Goechi
 1780-1782 Tuge Nechochi
 1782-1785 Tume Afochi
 1785-1800 Shagi Nechochi
 1800-1805 Bedi Nechochi
 1805-1810 Techi Nechochi
 1810-1820 unknown
 1820-1850 Galli Goechi
 1850-1887 Deji Goechi
 1887-1898 Techi Goechi

See also
Solomonic Dynasty
Rulers of Shewa
Yejju Oromo
Zagwe dynasty
Kingdom of Semien
Mudaito dynasty

Ethiopia politics-related lists
History of Ethiopia
 
Ethiopia history-related lists